Svinør is an island in Lindesnes municipality in Agder county, Norway.  The  island lies immediately south of the mainland by the village of Åvik.  The island essentially forms the southern part of the Åvik village harbour.  The island sits about half-way between the Lindesnes peninsula to the west and the town of Mandal to the east.  The fishing village is very picturesque due to its wooden houses dating back to the 1700s and 1800s.

History
Svinør was once a very prosperous port with its own customs house.  The port was a good port to protect ships in bad weather, especially near the harsh waters surrounding the Lindesnes peninsula (the Norwegian term uthavn meaning "exterior harbor").  During the early 1800s, there were over 100 residents on the small island, but by 1993, the last permanent resident left the island, leaving the island as a haven for holiday cottages that bring many residents each summer.

Media gallery

See also
List of islands of Norway

References

Lindesnes
Islands of Agder
Islands of the North Sea
Ports and harbours of the North Sea